Haystack Dam (National ID # OR00287) is a dam in central Oregon, about ten miles south of Madras.

The earthen dam was constructed in 1957 by the United States Bureau of Reclamation, with a height of 105 feet and 1200 feet long at its crest.  It serves as an offstream storage facility as part of the larger Deschutes Project, which also includes the Crane Prairie Reservoir and the Wickiup Reservoir.  The dam is owned by the Bureau and operated by the local North Unit Irrigation District.

The reservoir it creates, Haystack  Reservoir, has a water surface of 233 acres, about five linear miles of shoreline, and a maximum capacity of 5,600 acre-feet.  Recreation includes fishing (for largemouth bass, crappie, rainbow trout, kokanee, brown trout, and brown bullhead), camping, boating, and hunting.

References 

Dams in Oregon
Dams on the Deschutes River (Oregon)
Reservoirs in Oregon
United States Bureau of Reclamation dams
Dams completed in 1957
Buildings and structures in Jefferson County, Oregon
1957 establishments in Oregon
Lakes of Jefferson County, Oregon